The third season of the fantasy drama television series Game of Thrones premiered in the United States on HBO on March 31, 2013, and concluded on June 9, 2013. It was broadcast on Sunday at 9:00 pm in the United States, consisting of 10 episodes, each running approximately 50–60 minutes. The season is based roughly on the first half of A Storm of Swords (the third of the A Song of Ice and Fire novels by George R. R. Martin, of which the series is an adaptation). The series is adapted for television by David Benioff and D. B. Weiss. HBO renewed the series for a third season on April 10, 2012, nine days after the second season's premiere. Production began in July 2012. The show was filmed primarily in Ireland, Northern Ireland, Croatia, Iceland and Morocco. 

The story takes place in a fictional world, primarily upon a continent called Westeros, with one storyline occurring on another continent to the east, Essos. Like the novel, the season continues the storyline of The War of the Five Kings: after the death of Renly Baratheon, all four kings in Westeros believe they have a claim to the Iron Throne, besides Robb Stark, who seeks vengeance for the death of his father, Ned Stark, and independence for the North. The season also features other storylines: Daenerys Targaryen begins her rise in power in Essos; Ned's illegitimate son, Jon Snow, goes undercover beyond the Wall; the other Stark children struggle to survive up and down Westeros, but Robb is killed; Jaime Lannister returns to the capital; and all of Westeros is informed of the reawakened threat of the Army of the Dead.

Game of Thrones features a large ensemble cast, including Peter Dinklage, Nikolaj Coster-Waldau, Lena Headey, Emilia Clarke and Kit Harington. The season introduced a number of new cast members, including Diana Rigg, Ciarán Hinds, Nathalie Emmanuel and Iwan Rheon.

Critics praised the show's production values and cast. Viewership yet again rose compared to the previous season. It won 2 of the 16 Emmy Awards for which it was nominated; nominations included Outstanding Supporting Actor in a Drama Series (Dinklage), Outstanding Supporting Actress in a Drama Series (Clarke) and Outstanding Drama Series. It also won the Critics' Choice Television Award for Best Drama Series.

Episodes

Cast

Main cast 

 Peter Dinklage as Tyrion Lannister
 Lena Headey as Cersei Lannister
 Emilia Clarke as Daenerys Targaryen
 Kit Harington as Jon Snow
 Richard Madden as Robb Stark
 Iain Glen as Jorah Mormont
 Michelle Fairley as Catelyn Stark
 Aidan Gillen as Petyr "Littlefinger" Baelish
 Charles Dance as Tywin Lannister
 Liam Cunningham as Davos Seaworth
 Stephen Dillane as Stannis Baratheon
 Carice van Houten as Melisandre
 Natalie Dormer as Margaery Tyrell
 John Bradley as Samwell Tarly

 Jack Gleeson as Joffrey Baratheon
 Sophie Turner as Sansa Stark
 Oona Chaplin as Talisa Stark
 Sibel Kekilli as Shae
 Rose Leslie as Ygritte
 James Cosmo as Jeor Mormont
 Jerome Flynn as Bronn
 Nikolaj Coster-Waldau as Jaime Lannister
 Isaac Hempstead Wright as Bran Stark
 Maisie Williams as Arya Stark
 Alfie Allen as Theon Greyjoy
 Joe Dempsie as Gendry
 Rory McCann as Sandor "The Hound" Clegane
 Conleth Hill as Varys

Guest cast
The recurring actors listed here are those who appeared in season 3. They are listed by the region in which they first appear:

At and beyond the Wall
 Peter Vaughan as Maester Aemon
 Ben Crompton as Eddison Tollett
 Josef Altin as Pypar
 Mark Stanley as Grenn
 Luke Barnes as Rast
 Burn Gorman as Karl Tanner
 Will O'Connell as Todder
 Ciarán Hinds as Mance Rayder
 Kristofer Hivju as Tormund Giantsbane
 Edward Dogliani as the Lord of Bones
 Ian Whyte as Dongo
 Mackenzie Crook as Orell Skinchanger
 Robert Pugh as Craster
 Hannah Murray as Gilly
 Ross Mullan as White Walkers

In King's Landing
 Julian Glover as Grand Maester Pycelle
 Diana Rigg as Olenna Tyrell
 Finn Jones as Loras Tyrell
 Ian Beattie as Meryn Trant
 Daniel Portman as Podrick Payne
 Paul Bentley as the High Septon
 Will Tudor as Olyvar
 Esmé Bianco as Ros
 Josephine Gillan as Marei
 Pixie Le Knot as Kayla

On the Iron Islands
 Patrick Malahide as Balon Greyjoy
 Gemma Whelan as Yara Greyjoy

On Dragonstone
 Tara Fitzgerald as Selyse Florent
 Kerry Ingram as Shireen Baratheon
 Lucian Msamati as Salladhor Saan

In the North
 Art Parkinson as Rickon Stark
 Thomas Brodie-Sangster as Jojen Reed
 Ellie Kendrick as Meera Reed
 Iwan Rheon as Ramsay Snow
 Charlotte Hope as Myranda
 Kristian Nairn as Hodor
 Natalia Tena as Osha

In the Riverlands
 Tobias Menzies as Edmure Tully
 Clive Russell as Brynden Tully
 David Bradley as Walder Frey
 Tom Brooke as Lame Lothar Frey
 Tim Plester as Black Walder Rivers
 Michael McElhatton as Roose Bolton
 John Stahl as Rickard Karstark
 Gwendoline Christie as Brienne of Tarth
 Dean-Charles Chapman as Martyn Lannister
 Timothy Gibbons as Willem Lannister
 Noah Taylor as Locke
 Jamie Michie as Steelshanks Walton
 Richard Dormer as Beric Dondarrion
 Paul Kaye as Thoros of Myr
 Philip McGinley as Anguy
 Anton Lesser as Qyburn
 Ben Hawkey as Hot Pie

In Essos
 Dan Hildebrand as Kraznys mo Nakloz
 Clifford Barry as Greizhen mo Ullhor
 George Georgiou as Razdal mo Eraz
 Ian McElhinney as Barristan Selmy
 Ed Skrein as Daario Naharis
 Nathalie Emmanuel as Missandei
 Jacob Anderson as Grey Worm
 Mark Killeen as Mero
 Ramon Tikaram as Prendahl na Ghezn

The musicians Will Champion of Coldplay and Gary Lightbody of Snow Patrol made cameo appearances, and Bart the Bear 2 (a.k.a. "Little Bart") was the bear that fought in the pit at Harrenhal.

Production
Game of Thrones rapidly became a critical and commercial success after it started airing in April 2011. A few days after ratings for the second season's premiere, "The North Remembers", hit a series high of 8.3 million viewers,  HBO announced the show's renewal for a third season. Prior to that announcement, there had been rumors and reports that showrunners David Benioff and D. B. Weiss planned to shoot seasons three and four simultaneously. Benioff said that this would be very efficient, but impossible to write.

The ten episodes of the third season are longer than the previous seasons', about 54 or 57 minutes as opposed to about 52. The season's budget was reported to be around 50 million U.S. dollars.

Writing
The third season is based on the first half of the novel A Storm of Swords. Benioff had previously said that A Storm of Swords would need to be adapted in two seasons on account of its length. Benioff and Weiss also noted that they thought of Game of Thrones as an adaptation of the series as a whole, rather than of individual novels, which gave them the liberty to move scenes back and forth across novels according to the requirements of the screen adaptation. According to Benioff, the third season contains a particularly memorable scene from A Storm of Swords, the prospect of filming which was part of their motivation to adapt the novels for television in the first place. The writing credits for the third season now state "Written for television by", instead of the usual "Written by" credit.

Season 3 saw the first significant use of the Valyrian languages, spoken in doomed Valyria and its former colonies in Essos. The constructed languages were developed by linguist David J. Peterson based on the few words Martin invented for the novels. Peterson had previously developed the Dothraki language, used principally in season 1.

Casting
The third season adds previously recurring actors Oona Chaplin (Talisa Maegyr), Joe Dempsie (Gendry) and Rose Leslie (Ygritte) to the series' main cast.

After an absence of one season David Bradley returns as Walder Frey, Ian McElhinney as Barristan Selmy, Peter Vaughan as Maester Aemon, Josef Altin as Pypar and Luke McEwan as Rast.

Crew
David Benioff and D. B. Weiss serve as main writers and showrunners for the third season. They co-wrote seven out of ten episodes. The remaining three episodes were written by Bryan Cogman, Vanessa Taylor, and the author of A Song of Ice and Fire, George R. R. Martin.

Daniel Minahan, Alex Graves, Michelle MacLaren, and David Nutter each directed two episodes. One further episode was directed by previous series cinematographer, Alik Sakharov, whereas another was co-directed by Benioff and Weiss, both making their directorial debuts, although only Benioff is credited for directing the episode.

Filming
The filming of the third season began in early July 2012, and concluded with the wrap of the unit filming in Iceland on November 24, 2012. Filming in Iceland, for scenes in five of the season's ten episodes, took place near Akureyri and Lake Mývatn. Dimmuborgir was used as the location for Mance Rayder's wildling army camp, and the Grjótagjá cave was used as establishing shot of Jon Snow and Ygritte in the cave although most of this scene was filmed in the studio. The filming in Iceland lasted eight days, as opposed to nearly a month for season 2. Kit Harington (Jon Snow) broke an ankle in an accident in July, which required the Iceland shoots to be pushed back to give him time to heal, as well as the occasional use of a body double.

The production was again based in Belfast, Northern Ireland, and continued to receive support from the Northern Ireland Screen fund. The production used various locations in Northern Ireland to film scenes in the North and the Riverlands. Gosford Castle in Armagh, was used as the base for Riverrun Castle, home of House Tully.

The production also returned to Dubrovnik in Croatia for scenes in King's Landing. Morocco, a new location, was used to film Daenerys' scenes in Essos such as the city of Astapor, for which locations in Essaouira were used, and Yunkai, which was filmed in Aït Benhaddou. A scene involving a live bear was filmed in Los Angeles.

Music

The U.S. indie rock band The Hold Steady recorded "The Bear and the Maiden Fair", a ribald folk song from Martin's novels. The recording is played over the end credits of episode three, and the song is sung by Brienne and Jaime's captors in the same episode. Set to music by series composer Ramin Djawadi, the recording was released on a seven-inch record on Record Store Day, April 20, 2013.

The soundtrack for the season was released digitally on June 4, 2013, and on CD on July 2, 2013.

Reception

Critical response

Review aggregator Metacritic has a score of 91 for season 3, indicating "universal acclaim", based on 25 reviews. On Rotten Tomatoes, the third season has a 96% approval rating from 45 critics with an average rating of 8.59 out of 10. The site's critical consensus reads, "Game of Thrones continues to deliver top quality drama for adults, raising the stakes even higher and leaving viewers hungry for more."

Variety compared it to a "theatrical blockbuster", while The Denver Post praised its "horrors of war", "danger of shifting alliances", "anguish of intra-family rivalries", and "glorious visuals". The New York Times gave the season a positive review and stated, "They're [The actors] all fun to watch, even when their characters don't have anything in particular to do besides relay information that we need to keep up with the story or keep straight the seven (so we're told) warring families." Hank Stuever of The Washington Post gave the season a positive review and stated, "Game of Thrones succeeds because it accommodates both the casual viewer and the rabid fanatic, which is a nearly impossible trick in an age in which we ingest television and other media in the manner of a chicken who has outsmarted the Skinner box."

Slant Magazine gave the season 3 out of 4 and found it an improvement over the previous season for its "firm footing" and the "newfound sense of certain direction", while The Philadelphia Inquirer highlighted its "rousing start". The New York Post stated, "Not as much sex as you may be used to, but plenty of action, and enough complexities to keep geeks, geniuses and fans glued to the strange and wonderful world of the Seven Kingdoms all spring." Newsday gave the season a positive review and stated, "Game of Thrones is an exploration of the human heart -- don't blame the series if what it finds there is often so ugly." The Guardian gave the season a positive review and stated, "For all the pleasures - storylines so satisfyingly complicated you need spreadsheets to make sense of them, CGI dragons that dive into the sea and then toast the caught fish with their fiery breath - Game of Thrones asks bracing questions of its audience." 

Maureen Ryan of HuffPost praised its themes of compassion, betrayal and confusion, while Matt Zoller Seitz of Vulture praised its confidence and ambition. The Hollywood Reporter gave the season a positive review and stated, "Proving again that a genre series can be as serious and challenging as traditional dramas, Game of Thrones kicks off what should be its most ambitious season -- which is really saying something for this dense, layered epic." James Poniewozik of Time praised the premiere episode for its "flying dragons, family turmoil and, holy crap, giants!-it promises", although criticized its "jet-lagged hours of a return trip". On the other hand, Andy Greenwald of Grantland stated that the premiere episode was "outstanding, a globe-spinning, breast-baring, bug-stabbing blast". 

The Independent gave the season 3 out of 5 and stated, "The show takes itself very seriously indeed -- any thing less, you suspect, and it would collapse under its own absurdity. But there is wit here, too, amid the sweat and chunky knitwear." Slate gave the season a positive review and stated, "Game of Thrones gives us much to ruminate on regarding power, honor, and family. But it also reminds us that whether one is rich or poor, man or woman, honorable or evil, in Westeros life ain't fair." Slant Magazine gave the season a positive review and stated, "Game of Thrones's best season yet comes with a typically great transfer and enough extras to please devotees for days." Empire gave the season 5 out of 5 and stated, "Every time Game Of Thrones threatens to become a 'guilty pleasure', it pulls off something awesome."

Ratings

Accolades

For the 65th Primetime Emmy Awards, the third season received 16 nominations, including for Outstanding Drama Series, Peter Dinklage for Outstanding Supporting Actor in a Drama Series, Emilia Clarke for Outstanding Supporting Actress in a Drama Series, Diana Rigg for Outstanding Guest Actress in a Drama Series, and David Benioff and D. B. Weiss for Outstanding Writing for a Drama Series for the episode "The Rains of Castamere". That episode also won the 2014 Hugo Award for Best Dramatic Presentation, Short Form. Game of Thrones won the award for Outstanding Achievement in Drama for the 29th TCA Awards, and also received a nomination for Program of the Year. For the 20th Screen Actors Guild Awards, the cast was nominated for Best Drama Ensemble, Peter Dinklage was nominated for Best Drama Actor, and the series won for Best Stunt Team.

Release

Broadcast
The day after the third season premiered in the U.S., it premiered in the United Kingdom on Sky Atlantic, in Australia on Foxtel, and in New Zealand on SoHo.

Home media

It was made available for purchase as a digital download on the iTunes store, in Australia only, in parallel to the U.S. premiere.
However, on May 14, 2013, Foxtel blocked the Australian iTunes store from making the episodes available soon after they screened in the U.S. Season 3 was reported to be the most infringed TV show via torrents during spring 2013, estimated to be 5.2 million downloads via BitTorrent.

Copyright infringement
The third season of Game of Thrones was the most-pirated TV series in 2013.

References

External links

  – official US site
  – official UK site
 Game of Thrones – The Viewers Guide on HBO.com
 Making Game of Thrones on HBO.com
 
 

Season 3
2013 American television seasons